Fredrik Gustafsson (born 4 May 1964) is a Swedish bobsledder. He competed in the two man and the four man events at the 1994 Winter Olympics.

References

1964 births
Living people
Swedish male bobsledders
Olympic bobsledders of Sweden
Bobsledders at the 1994 Winter Olympics
Sportspeople from Örebro
20th-century Swedish people